Benjamin Franklin Turner Sr. (1873 – 25 May 1950) was the Mayor of Passaic, New Jersey. He was a city commissioner for Passaic, New Jersey five times and was the director of parks and public improvements. Turner was first elected as a city commissioner for a four-year term. He died on 25 May 1950.

References

1873 births
1950 deaths
Mayors of Passaic, New Jersey